Qualitative descriptions or distinctions are based on some quality or characteristic rather than on some quantity or measured value.

Qualitative may also refer to:

Qualitative property, a property that can be observed but not measured numerically
Qualitative research, a research paradigm focusing on non-quantifiable measurements
Qualitative analysis (disambiguation)
Qualitative data, data that is not quantified
Qualitative observation, descriptive observations we make with our senses

See also
Quantitative
Quality (philosophy)